Moel Tryfan (429 m / 1407 ft) is a small mountain near the villages of Rhosgadfan, Y Fron and Betws Garmon, in northern Gwynedd. The higher and more famous peak of Tryfan above Dyffryn Ogwen has also sometimes been referred to as "Moel Tryfan" in the past.

Moel Tryfan could be regarded as the westerly outlier of the larger Mynydd Mawr. The southern and eastern flanks of the mountain were heavily quarried in the past, particularly at Moel Tryfran Quarry and Cilgwyn quarry.

External links 
 www.geograph.co.uk : photos of Moel Tryfan and surrounding area

Betws Garmon
Llandwrog
Llanwnda, Gwynedd
Mountains and hills of Gwynedd